The Mirage Lightweight Racing Car was a family of race cars built by J.W. Automotive Engineereing (JWAE) at Slough in England, initially to compete in international sports car races in the colours of the Gulf Oil Corporation.

In all, from 1974 to 1978, the Mirages never finished outside of the top-ten positions at Le Mans, posting a first, two seconds, a third, a fourth, a fifth, and a tenth. Mirage race cars were the first to wear the legendary powder blue and marigold livery of Gulf Oil, the first to post race wins for Gulf Oil, and the last to win the 24 Hours of Le Mans overall for Gulf Oil.

Mirage is one of only two independently constructed racing car marques (the other is Rondeau) to win the 24 Hours of Le Mans overall since the post-World War II return of the Grand Prix d’Endurance in 1949.

History
The Mirage Lightweight Racing Car was a family of racing cars built by John Wyer Automotive Engineering (JWAE) in Slough , England , initially to compete in international sports car racing in the colors of the Gulf Oil Corporation 1 . It all started in the spring of 1967, after Ford's decision to discontinue the Ford GT40 project.

During the preliminary tests for the 24 Hours of Le Mans, two "fake" Ford GT40s in the colors of the Gulf oil tanker appeared. They are in fact Mirages based on Ford GT 40 Mk I in which the American firm no longer believed.

John Wyer bought out an old project by Len Bailey, an English designer, which aimed to improve the aerodynamics, mass, and suspensions of the Mk Is. The Mirages M1 made its first run on March 21, 1967. Le Mans will be their first real test.

In the preliminary tests, the two M1s do better than the GT40s but give up in the race.

But before that, they won the 1,000 kilometers of Spa and continued their series in Sweden, Paris, and Kyalami thanks in particular to Jacky Ickx.

A total of three M1s were produced. The M10002 and M10003 reverted to GT 40s (P/1074 and P/1075) while the M10001 continued its career in South Africa.

In 1972, John Wyer took over the project to participate in the World Sportscar Championship and replace the Porsche 917 which no longer met the new regulations. After three years of development, the marque won the 1975 24 Hours of Le Mans with the Mirage GR8.

Following this victory, Gulf and John Wyer decided to withdraw from the competition. The structure is taken over by Harley Cluxton III which will race the GR8 in 1976 and 1977, it thus offers the first podium at the 24 Hours of Le Mans for the Renault V6 turbo engine prefiguring the only victory of the diamond mark in 1978 with Jean -Pierre Jaussaud and Didier Pironi.

Along with Rondeau, Mirage is one of only two independently built racing car marques to win the 24 Hours of Le Mans overall since the return of endurance racing after World War II in 1949.

In total, from 1974 to 1978, the Mirages never finished outside the top ten places at Le Mans, posting one first, two seconds, third, fourth, fifth, and tenth place. Mirage race cars were the first to wear Gulf Oil's legendary powder blue and Marigold (a yellow-orange) livery, the first to claim victories for Gulf Oil, and the last to win the 24 Hours of Le Mans overall for Gulf Oil.

M1
For the 1967 season, JWAE built and raced the M1, a Sports prototype based on the Ford GT40. The M1 used the standard Ford GT40 V8 engine in various capacities up to 5.7 litres. The highlight of the M1's short racing career was without doubt the victory by Jacky Ickx and Dick Thompson in chassis M.1003 in the 1967 Spa-Francorchamps 1000 km. The sole surviving Mirage M1 is on public display at the Blackhawk Museum in Danville, California (no longer on display mid April 2017).

M2, M3
The M2 was built in 1968 for the new 3 Litre Group 6 Prototype class, but the BRM V12 powered cars were rarely raced and met with no success.  The revised and roofless M3 of 1969 was powered by the Ford Cosworth DFV V8 but again this model saw little use, JWA having largely concentrated on racing Ford GT40s during these two years.

M4, M5
The M4 was a roadster conceived between the end of 1969 and the beginning of 1970 coupling M3 chassis with a 5-liter Ford GT40 engine, but development of this particular car was stopped once JWAE signed the agreement with Porsche to use their 917 for the 1970 season, while in 1969 M5, a Formula Ford single seater, was built, and raced during 1970 British F.Ford season under Willment Group banner. Many fans got confused about M4-M5 denomination due to John Horsmann calling M5 the roadster and M4 the single seater.

M6

After competing with Porsche 917s during the 1970 & 1971 seasons, JWAE developed the new Ford Cosworth powered M6 model to race as a Group 5 Sports Car in the new World Championship for Makes from 1972.

At the end of the 1971 season big "5 liter sportcars" like Porsche 917 and Ferrari 512 were banned, leaving the scene to nimbler "3 liter prototypes" and JWAE was ready with a new project from Len Bailey: the M6. The M6 consisted of a steel reinforced riveted aluminium  chassis coupled with a detuned 3 liter Cosworth DFV Formula 1 engine as a stressed member, and covered by open fiberglass bodywork with a large rear wing: the first chassis was completed in March 1972 and raced at 12 Hours of Sebring, the second car was completed halfway into the season, and the third was used to test Weslake V12 engine. While heavier, the Weslake V12 was expected to be smoother and more powerful than the Cosworth, whose strong vibrations caused many reliability issues. Again the only victory was at Spa, in the 1973 Spa-Francorchamps 1000 km. Apart from this win, the 1973 season was less than successful. Most of the teams resources were dedicated to Weslake V12 engine development, which did not prove better than the Cosworth, and led to the end of the program with four chassis out of five rebuilt as GR7.

The M6 Coupé was the closed version with low-drag bodywork and powered by the 2995 cc Ford-Weslake V12 engine planned to be used at 1973 24 Hours of Le Mans: poor performances (laptimes were 16 seconds slower than M6-Cosworth) ended the project.

GR7

The GR7 model was renamed to Gulf GR7 for 1974, reflecting the sponsorship involvement of Gulf Oil which dated from 1967. "Gulf Ford" placed second in the 1974 World Championship for Makes.

GR8

In 1975 the team obtained its last victory in the 24 Hours of Le Mans with the GR8 driven by Jacky Ickx and  Derek Bell. The other car finished third with Vern Schuppan and Jean-Pierre Jaussaud.
The race was excluded from the World Championship for Makes by the CSI because of new fuel consumption rules introduced for the race in the wake of the oil crisis.

Jean-Louis Lafosse and François Migault both finished second in the 1976 24 Hours of Le Mans.

In 1977 the car was fitted with a Renault  turbo V6 engine to replace the naturally aspirated Cosworth DFV  V8.

Vern Schuppan and Jean-Pierre Jarier finished second in the 1977 24 Hours of Le Mans.

M8
Upon Gulf Oil’s sponsorship withdrawal from international sports car racing in late 1975, American entrepreneur and former racing driver Harley Cluxton III purchased the Mirage team and all associated manufacturing rights from John Wyer and the Gulf Research Racing Company. As a Group 6 Prototype entrant, Cluxton continued successfully contesting the Mirages at Le Mans as a two car team. With primary sponsorship from JCB Excavators, Elf Lubricants, and Renault Sport, and under the continued management of John Horsman and counsel of John Wyer, the Mirage M8 finished second overall in both 1976 (Cosworth engine) and 1977 (Renault engine), behind Porsche’s factory Martini 936s.

M9
The M9 of 1978 featured a new open long-tail body and was powered by a turbocharged 2.1 liter 6 cylinder Renault engine. Two examples started in the 1978 24 Hours of Le Mans with one gaining tenth place.

M10
The M10 of 1979 used an updated M8 chassis with revised open long-tail body and a 3-liter Ford Cosworth DFV engine. Two M10s were entered in the 1979 24 Hours of Le Mans by Grand Touring Cars Inc / Ford Concessionaires France, officially as Ford M10s.  Neither car finished.

M12
The last Mirage to be constructed was the M12, a Group C prototype featuring an aluminum honeycomb monocoque and Cosworth 3.9 liter DFL engine. Entered at the 1982 24 Hours of Le Mans with Mario Andretti and son Michael Andretti co-driving for the first time, the car was ultimately disqualified 20 minutes prior to the start of the race for a technical infraction relating to the placement of an oil cooler.  Much controversy surrounded the ACO's decision, with many citing organizational politics as the cause. Though the M12 showed great potential as both a Group C and IMSA GTP competitor, the program was aborted after Le Mans.

IndyCar project
In the summer of 1982, Grand Touring Cars, Inc. president Harley E. Cluxton III began negotiations with Renault to build an engine for the CART Championship and the Indianapolis 500, derived from the six-cylinder two-liter turbo already used a few years earlier by the GTC-Mirage on the GR8 Renault and the M9. The car must be ready to participate in the 1983 season. The seat is for Mario Andretti, Rick Mears, Tom Sneva, or Geoff Brabham. The GTC-Mirage team believes that the rules of the American championship put the new engine on a par with the eight-cylinder Cosworth DFX, which at the time was installed on almost all the cars which participated in it. Redesigning the engine to reach the displacement limit of 2.65 liters should lead the French V6 to deliver around 800 hp with weight and dimensions lower than those of the competitor, as well as reliability which should be better. The project is approved by Renault, which provides engines, financial support, and technical support to the American team from 1983 to 1985, before cutting funds at the end of 1985, when the diamond firm withdrew from the American market with the sale of its Renault USA subsidiary and the AMC brand to Chrysler. Meanwhile, the new engine is installed in a Lola T900 (HU19 chassis number 24) from the Doug Shierson Racing team, which had been tested by Al Unser Jr. at Rattlesnake Raceway in Midland, West Texas. the private test track of Chaparral Cars, to end up in the hands of a private collector.

References

Bibliography 
 .
Time and Two Seats (© 1999 by Motorsport Research Group)

External links

 http://www.gtc-mirage.com Official Website
 photos
Ford Mirage M1

Sports racing cars
British racecar constructors
24 Hours of Le Mans race cars
Le Mans winning cars
Defunct motor vehicle manufacturers of the United Kingdom